Make it Work may refer to:

Songs 
"Make it Work", by Christina Grimmie from With Love
"Make it Work", by Majid Jordan from Majid Jordan
"Make it Work", by Ne-Yo from Because of You
"Make it Work", by Keke Wyatt from Rated Love

Other 
A catchphrase used by fashion designer and television personality Tim Gunn